Leone Valle (born 1885, date of death unknown) was an Italian equestrian. He competed in two events at the 1924 Summer Olympics.

References

External links
 

1885 births
Year of death missing
Italian male equestrians
Olympic equestrians of Italy
Equestrians at the 1924 Summer Olympics
Place of birth missing